"Still Trappin'" is a song by American rappers Lil Durk and King Von. It was released on December 24, 2020, from the former's sixth studio album, The Voice. The song marks the sixth collaboration between the artists. Deemed a "menacing", "sinister" song, it finds the rappers detailing life in gangsterism.

Background
Lil Durk and King Von were labelmates and friends and had collaborated various times, ranging from 2019's "Crazy Story" remix and "Twin Nem", and 2020's "All These Niggas", "Baguette's" and "Down Me". Following Von's death, Lil Durk paid tribute to him on The Voice single, "Backdoor".

Composition
The song finds Von performing the chorus, with the duo delivering "ruthless" verses "full of threats and boasts". lab.fm and Hypebeast both called the song "menacing", while Contactmusic.com observed it as a "sinister" song: "The stripped back song has a dark under current, scored by a bass heavy piano that soundtracks the vocal sparring".

Critical reception
Hypebasts Ross Dwyer said "Standout bars include Von's witty quips about his cartel connections and Durk's darkly humorous admonition that his female friends carry tasers". Contactmusic.com wrote favorably: "The production is all the better because of what's been left out. The limited use of anything other than the vocals and the keyboards works a treat to deliver up a track that stands out from many of the others on The Voice because of its individuality. The lyrical content manifests itself perfectly through the music as the themes that Lil Durk touches on; drugs, dependency, prison and contract killing are not light or throwaway. 'Still Trappin' has a near cinematic feel to it when heard in isolation from the rather gratuitous video". Revolt's Regina Cho noted how "Von calls out clout-chasers while Durk slides on the beat with a lyrical verse". Reviewing the song's parent album, Stereogums Tom Breihan deemed the song a highlight: "For me, the album only really crackles with electricity on 'Still Trappin' — the song where the late King Von shows up, and where Durk really raps rather than doing his bluesy singsong thing".

Music video
The official video was directed by CrownSoHeavy and was released on January 7, 2021. The "murky, blue-tinted" visual does not feature King Von, as the video was shot after his death. Durk performs both Von's chorus and his own verses, while he and his friends party in the studio. The Faders Jordan Darville said, "They're having fun, but you never get the sense that they're trying to avoid dealing with the tragedy that surrounds the song. Durk pays homage to Von by sporting a custom jacket with a large portrait of Von airbrushed onto the back. The video closes with the #DoIt4Von hashtag.

Charts

Weekly charts

Year-end charts

Certifications

References

2020 songs
Lil Durk songs
King Von songs
Song recordings produced by Yung Berg
Songs released posthumously
Songs written by Lil Durk
Songs written by Hitmaka